The Lincoln County Courthouse is a historic two-story building in North Platte, Nebraska, and the courthouse of Lincoln County, Nebraska. It was built in 1921–1924, and again in 1931–1932, by H.R. McMichael. The building was designed in the Classical Revival and Beaux-Arts styles by architects George A. Berlinghof and Cecil Calvert Coursey. It has been listed on the National Register of Historic Places since January 10, 1990.

References

External links

National Register of Historic Places in Lincoln County, Nebraska
Neoclassical architecture in Nebraska
Government buildings completed in 1921
1921 establishments in Nebraska